Europe's Biggest Dance Show 2022 was the fifth iteration of Europe's Biggest Dance Show, a multi-nation dance music simulcast presented by Euroradio and hosted by BBC Radio 1, in collaboration with ten other radio stations from across Europe: 1LIVE, FM4, Fritz, NPO 3FM, NRK mP3, RTÉ 2FM, Studio Brussel, SR P3, YleX, and for the first time, Radio Promin of Ukrainian national broadcasting company UA:PBC.

Background 
The British Broadcasting Corporation (BBC) announced on 5 October 2022 that the fifth iteration of Europe's Biggest Dance Show would take place on 14 October.

The simulcast started at 18:30 BST, with Danny Howard introducing for BBC Radio 1 in London. As was the case for the 2021 iteration of the simulcast, each radio station contributed 30 minutes of dance music from their respective country. Each radio station sent their feeds to Broadcasting House in London, where they were mixed by BBC senior technical producer Dan Morris before being sent back to the radio stations for broadcast.

NPO 3FM from the Netherlands returned after withdrawing from the 2021 iteration, while Ukraine's Radio Promin contributed for the first time.

Running order

See also 

 Europe's Biggest Dance Show 2019
 Europe's Biggest Dance Show 2020
 Europe's Biggest Dance Show 2021
 BBC Radio 1
 European Broadcasting Union

References 

2022 in radio
BBC Radio 1 programmes
British music radio programmes
RTÉ 2fm programmes
Sveriges Radio programmes